The MKEK-4 Uğur (Turkish: "Luck") was a basic trainer aircraft which was used by the Turkish Air Force between 1955-1963. Originally developed as the THK-15, in total 57 Uğurs were produced in Turkey, all of which were used in the Turkish AF Flight School except three which were donated to the Royal Jordanian Air Force.

Operators

 Royal Jordanian Air Force

 Turkish Air Force

Specifications

References

 Bridgman, Leonard. Jane's All The World's Aircraft 1955–56, New York: The McGraw-Hill Book Company, 1955.
Nikolajsen, Ole. "Lucky or Not? The Story of the Miles Magister in Turkey". Air Enthusiast. Thirty-Three, May–August 1987. pp. 69–73.

External links
 Turkish Air Force Academy,Aviation Museum
 tayyareci.com

1950s Turkish military trainer aircraft
Single-engined tractor aircraft
Low-wing aircraft
Turkish Aeronautical Association aircraft
Mechanical and Chemical Industry Corporation aircraft